Kamalganj is an upazila of the Moulvibazar District in the Division of Sylhet, Bangladesh.

Etymology

There was a local zamindar by the name of Kinkar Nath Ray who appointed a naib by the name of Kamal Narayan in order to develop the land. Kamal established a ganj (treasured neighbourhood) named after himself. In 1922, Kamalganj was made a thana and in 1983, an upazila.

History
Kamalganj was a part of the ancient Ita Kingdom founded by Raja Bhanu Narayan. The final raja of the Ita Kingdom, Raja Subid Narayan lost a battle in 1610 in which the region became under the rule of Khwaja Usman. However, this rule was short-lived after Mughal General Islam Khan I's attack in 1612. The battle between the Mughal Empire and Khwaja Usman was held in Patanushar, Kamalganj. This led to the death of Afghan leader Khwaja Usman.

A peasant rebellion (krishokproja bidraho) against zamindar of Prithimpasa led by Manipuri leader Panchanan Singh, Baikunthanath Sharma ,Themba Singh and Qasim Ali was held in the 1900s in bhanubil, Kamalganj.

Demographics

As of the 1991 Bangladesh census, Kamalganj has a population of 191,672. Males constitute 50.98% of the population, and females 49.02%. This Upazila's eighteen up population is 102,877. Kamalganj has an average literacy rate of 28.6% (7+ years), compared to the national average of 32.4%. Majority of the residents are Bengalis although there is a minority of indigenous peoples such as the Khasi, Manipuris, Bishnupriya Manipuris, Tripuris and Garos.

Economy and tourism
Kamalganj is home to many tourist attractions and natural geography. It contains many tea gardens and the Lawachara National Park. Other sites include the mausoleums of Shah Kala in Bhadair-Deul (near Shamshernagar Rail Station), Shah Ghayb (north of Bhanugach Rail Station) and Shah Ghazi Malik in Bhadair-Deul. The ruins of the Ita Kingdom can be found across Kamalganj. The forts of Khwaja Usman, his grave and false tomb can be found in Patanushar in the areas of Srisurya and Usmangarh.

Administration

Kamalganj Upazila is divided into Kamalganj Municipality and 9 union parishads: Adampur, Ali Nagar, Islampur, Kamalganj, Madhabpur, Munshi Bazar, Patanushar, Rahimpur, and Shamsher Nagar. The union parishads are subdivided into 116 mauzas and 253 villages.

Kamalganj Municipality is subdivided into 9 wards and 27 mahallas.

Notable residents
 Chowdhury Gulam Akbar, writer, was born in Dargahpur village in 1921.
 Mohammad Keramat Ali, former Member of the Pakistan National Assembly
 Surendra Kumar Sinha, 21st Chief Justice of Bangladesh
 Ashraf Hussain, poet, writer, researcher
 Khwaja Usman, Mughal opponent and Baro-Bhuyan chieftain

See also
Upazilas of Bangladesh
Districts of Bangladesh
Divisions of Bangladesh

References

External links